

Notes

References

See also
List of monastic houses in Ireland

Waterford
Monastic houses
Monastic houses
Monastic houses